Lee Richmond, pitcher for the Worcester Worcesters, pitched a perfect game against the Cleveland Blues by retiring all 27 batters he faced on Saturday, June 12, 1880. This event took place in the Worcester Agricultural Fairgrounds in Worcester, Massachusetts.

Background
The Worcesters were in their first ever season in the National League, having previously played in the National Association. Prior to the game, Worcester opened up a three-game series with the Cleveland Blues by beating them by a 5–0 score two days earlier (June 10). The record of Worcester was 13–9 (second place) and Cleveland being at 12–9 (third place).

The game
Richmond had one of only three hits during the game, with Irwin having the latter two. While on base, Irwin contributed the only run of the game; second baseman Fred Dunlap bobbled a throw that had come from pitcher Jim McCormick that counted for an error, and Irwin ran for home plate. On the throw home by Dunlap, the ball went over Doc Kennedy's head for another error. Worcester left two men on base, in part due to a 6-4-3 double play from Glasscock to Dunlap to Phillips. Three outs were recorded on "foul bounds", where the ball was caught by the fielder after it had bounced once in foul territory, a rule that was in place at the time until 1883. The game lasted 1 hour and 26 minutes, with a seven-minute delay due to rain in the seventh inning. This was the first ever perfect game in Major League Baseball history, and it was the second ever no-hitter in league history (the first being in 1876).

Game statistics
June 12, Worcester Agricultural Fairgrounds, Worcester, Massachusetts

Box score

References

1880 Major League Baseball season
Major League Baseball perfect games
1880 in sports in Massachusetts
Baseball in Worcester, Massachusetts
Cleveland Blues (NL)
June 1880 sports events
History of Worcester, Massachusetts
Tourist attractions in Worcester, Massachusetts